Robert Chance (September 10, 1940 – October 3, 2013) was a first baseman and right fielder in Major League Baseball who played for the Cleveland Indians,  Washington Senators and California Angels in part of six seasons spanning 1963 through 1969. He was born in Statesboro, Georgia.

His most productive season in 1964 with the Indians, when he batted a .279 average and posted career numbers in hits (109), runs scored (45), home runs (14), RBI (75) and games played (120). Over his MLB career, Chance appeared in 277 games; his 195 hits included 34 doubles, one triple and 24 homers. He knocked in 112 runs.

Additionally, Chance played two seasons in Japan for the Sankei/Yakult Atoms.

In between, Chance played winter ball with the Leones de Ponce of the Puerto Rican League during the 1961-62 season, and for the Cardenales de Lara of the Venezuelan League in 1968-69.

Chance died in 2013 in Charleston, West Virginia at the age of 73.

Sources

External links

1940 births
2013 deaths
African-American baseball players
American expatriate baseball players in Japan
Baseball players from Georgia (U.S. state)
Buffalo Bisons (minor league) players
Burlington Indians players (1958–1964)
California Angels players
Cardenales de Lara players
American expatriate baseball players in Venezuela
Charleston Indians players
Cleveland Indians players
Deaths from cancer in West Virginia
Deaths from prostate cancer
El Paso Sun Kings players
Hawaii Islanders players
Leones de Ponce players
Major League Baseball first basemen
Major League Baseball right fielders
People from Statesboro, Georgia
Richmond Braves players
Sankei Atoms players
Sportspeople from Charleston, West Virginia
Yakult Atoms players
Washington Senators (1961–1971) players
20th-century African-American sportspeople
21st-century African-American people